Eugene Forrest Hamilton (born July 4, 1941) is an American politician. He is a member of the Mississippi House of Representatives from the 6th District, being first elected in 2003. A pharmacist, he is a member of the Republican party.

References

1941 births
Living people
Republican Party members of the Mississippi House of Representatives
People from Olive Branch, Mississippi